Indrė is a Lithuanian feminine given name. Individuals bearing the name Indrė include:
Indrė Jakubaitytė (born 1976), Lithuanian javelin thrower 
Indrė Kirjanovaitė (born 1989), Lithuanian footballer 
Indrė Girdauskaitė (born 1998), Lithuanian diver
Indrė Šerpytytė (born 1983), Lithuanian artist
Indrė Sorokaitė (born 1988), Lithuanian-born Italian volleyball player
Indrė Valaitė (born 1983), Lithuanian orienteer
Indrė Valantinaitė (born 1984), Lithuanian poet
Indre Viskontas, Lithuanian-Canadian neuroscientist and operatic soprano

References 

Lithuanian feminine given names
Feminine given names